Robert 'Bob' Robertson  (1926-2019), was an England international lawn bowler.

Bowls career
Robertson finished runner-up to the legendary David Bryant at the 1972 National Championship singles final.

He represented England in the fours event, at the 1974 British Commonwealth Games in Christchurch, New Zealand.

In 1972 he was the Yorkshire singles county champion. In addition he was the pairs champion in 1971, triples in 1969 and fours champion in 1971.

In 1978 he appeared at his second Commonwealth Games when he participated in the fours again.

References

1926 births
2019 deaths
English male bowls players
Bowls players at the 1974 British Commonwealth Games
Bowls players at the 1978 Commonwealth Games
Commonwealth Games competitors for England